Famous Stars & Straps (or simply Famous) is an American clothing and accessory line created by blink-182 drummer Travis Barker in December 1999. The company is based in Encino, California and operates online as a direct-to-consumer brand.

Description 
Famous Stars & Straps embraces the California lifestyle, punk music, tattoos and cars.

Their stylized "F" logo, known as the "Badge of Honor", designed by Eddie Santos (Black Flys / Wahoo's Fish Taco) aka "Rock Da Mullet", has become synonymous with the brand.

Famous specializes in tees, hoodies, jackets, hats, accessories, and other special items.

Famous Stars Fmx 
• Jeremy Twitch Stenberg

References 

Blink-182
Clothing brands of the United States
Skateboarding companies
Surfwear brands